Malawi and Nigeria have had diplomatic relations since 1964. The Malawian high Commission to Nigeria is based in Ethiopia. The Nigerian High Commission to Malawi is now based in Lilongwe, Malawi following the formal opening of Diplomatic Mission in September 2012 by the then-Nigerian President Goodluck Ebele Jonathan, GCFR.

Early foreign policy
The relationship between the countries dates back to Kamuzu Banda's Foreign Policy  and has included training programs. This policy has continued through the next two administrations.

Current situation
The Joyce Banda administration has moved to bring closer ties between the two nations.

See also 
 Foreign relations of Malawi
 Foreign relations of Nigeria

References

Nigeria
Bilateral relations of Nigeria
Nigeria
Malawi